Edith Frohock (1917–1997) was an American artist who lived and worked in Birmingham, Alabama. Frohock specialized in painting, printmaking and artist's books and was the first instructor to teach book arts in the South.

Frohock was part of the Mississippi Art Colony, where she was the featured instructor in 1984. The Smithsonian lists the Colony as the country's oldest artist-run organization of its kind. Through the University of Alabama at Birmingham, friends and family endowed the "Edith Frohock Scholarship". The scholarship is awarded to a Bachelor of Arts or Bachelor of Fine Arts student in junior standing with a 3.0 grade point average or higher. Sara Garden Armstrong replaced Frohock on her retirement. 
Frohock was part of the Mississippi Art Colony where she was the featured instructor in 1984.

Books
 "Dance-space: Event/installation," 1981, Members of the Birmingham Museum of Art, Birmingham, Alabama ASIN: B0007379KY
 "Paper works by Sharon Burg and Marji Clark," 1982, University of Alabama at Birmingham (Visual Arts Gallery) Birmingham, Alabama ASIN: B0007183Y2
 UAB Visual Arts Gallery," 1977, University of Alabama at Birmingham (Visual Arts Gallery) Birmingham, Alabama ASIN: B0007181TY
 "Works by Edith Frohock," Text by A. Granata, 1987, University of Alabama at Birmingham (Dept. of Art, School of Humanities) Birmingham, Alabama ASIN: B000725CXG
 "UAB Faculty Exhibition: Edith Frohock, Cerise Camille, Janice Kluge, Sonja Rieger," by Dept. of Art, University of Alabama at Birmingham, (Visual Arts Gallery) Birmingham, Alabama, 1984
 "Works from the Permanent Collection," 1984, University of Alabama at Birmingham (Visual Arts Gallery) Birmingham, Alabama ASIN: B0007188KG
 "German Masters of Twentieth Century Art [and] Contemporary German Artists by Museum of Arts," 1976, Essays by Ellen de M. Weiland, Barita Ann Rivenbark, Edith Frohock, Charlotte Gafford and Margaret D. Sizemore Birmingham Museum of Art, Birmingham, Alabama
 "American Art Directory," 1989, drawings by Edith Frohock, Page 257, R.R. Bowker, American Federation of Arts

References

External links
 "Book Arts:  Four Approaches" 1991 collaboration with Mary Ann Sampson, decorative papers and binding by Paula Marie Gourley, University of Alabama, Tuscaloosa, Alabama.
 Application For The Frohock Scholarship
 Methodology of "skinning the (CAT)Tt lists Edith Frohock as a correspondent to this project

Artists from Birmingham, Alabama
Modern printmakers
Book artists
1917 births
1997 deaths
Women book artists
American women printmakers
Women in publishing
20th-century American women artists
20th-century American printmakers